No. 8 Squadron RNZAF was a New Zealand Bomber Reconnaissance squadron in the South Pacific during World War II.

History
In response to Japan's entry into World War II, the Squadron was formed in March 1942 for the defence of New Zealand using obsolescent Vickers Vincent and Vickers Vildebeest torpedo bombers, which had been being used up to that point for training pilots bound to the war in Europe.  As the risk of Japanese aggression reduced, the squadron was reformed as a Dive Bomber Squadron in preparation to going on the offensive in May 1943 - when it was re-numbered as No. 30 Squadron RNZAF and re-equipped with Grumman Avengers.

The squadron was reformed in October 1944 as a Bomber Reconnaissance squadron equipped with Lockheed Venturas.  It moved to a patrol role from Fiji in November and December of that year, from the beginning of 1945 moving to Guadalcanal and then Emirau in February.  As operations in the South West Pacific wound down, it was disbanded there in March 1945.

Commanding officers
 Squadron Leader C. L. Monckton April–September 1942 
 Squadron Leader I. G. Morrison September 1942–April 1943 
 Flight Lieutenant M. Wilkes April–May 1943
 Wing Commander L. H. Parry October–November 1944 
 Wing Commander I. R. Salmond November 1944–March 1945

08
Military units and formations established in 1942
Squadrons of the RNZAF in World War II